There Goes My Baby may refer to:

 "There Goes My Baby" (The Drifters song), 1959
 "There Goes My Baby" (Enrique Iglesias song), 2014
 "There Goes My Baby" (Charlie Wilson song), 2008
 "There Goes My Baby" (Trisha Yearwood song), 1998
 "There Goes My Baby" (Usher song), 2010
 There Goes My Baby (film) or The Last Days of Paradise, a 1994 film starring Dermot Mulroney